Anonychomyrma is a genus of ants in the subfamily Dolichoderinae.

Distribution and habitat
The genus is mainly distributed in New Guinea, Solomon Islands and Australia; a single species is known from Malaysia and Indonesia. They nest on the ground or in trees, with colonies consisting of 500 to tens of thousands individuals.

Species

Anonychomyrma anguliceps (Forel, 1901)
Anonychomyrma angusta (Stitz, 1911)
Anonychomyrma arcadia (Forel, 1915)
Anonychomyrma biconvexa (Santschi, 1928)
Anonychomyrma dimorpha (Viehmeyer, 1912)
Anonychomyrma extensa (Emery, 1887)
Anonychomyrma fornicata (Emery, 1914)
Anonychomyrma froggatti (Forel, 1902)
Anonychomyrma gigantea (Donisthorpe, 1943)
Anonychomyrma gilberti (Forel, 1902)
Anonychomyrma glabrata (Smith, 1857)
Anonychomyrma incisa (Stitz, 1932)
Anonychomyrma itinerans (Lowne, 1865)
Anonychomyrma longicapitata (Donisthorpe, 1947)
Anonychomyrma longiceps (Forel, 1907)
Anonychomyrma malandana (Forel, 1915)
Anonychomyrma minuta (Donisthorpe, 1943)
Anonychomyrma murina (Emery, 1911)
Anonychomyrma myrmex Donisthorpe, 1947
Anonychomyrma nitidiceps (André, 1896)
Anonychomyrma polita (Stitz, 1912)
Anonychomyrma procidua (Erichson, 1842)
Anonychomyrma purpurescens (Lowne, 1865)
Anonychomyrma scrutator (Smith, 1859)
Anonychomyrma sellata (Stitz, 1911)
Anonychomyrma tigris (Stitz, 1912)

References

External links

 
Dolichoderinae
Ant genera
Hymenoptera of Asia
Hymenoptera of Australia
Taxa named by Horace Donisthorpe